Jeremiah 2 is the second chapter of the Book of Jeremiah in the Hebrew Bible or the Old Testament of the Christian Bible. This book contains prophecies attributed to the prophet Jeremiah, and is one of the Books of the Prophets. Chapters 2 to 6 contain the earliest preaching of Jeremiah on the apostasy of Israel. Verses 2:1 to 3:5 dramatize the ending of "marriage" between Yahweh and Israel.

Text 
The original text of this chapter, as with the rest of the Book of Jeremiah, was written in the Hebrew language. Since the division of the Bible into chapters and verses in the late medieval period, this chapter is divided into 37 verses.

Textual witnesses
Some early manuscripts containing the text of this chapter in Hebrew are of the Masoretic Text tradition, which includes the Codex Cairensis (895), the Petersburg Codex of the Prophets (916), Aleppo Codex (10th century), Codex Leningradensis (1008).

There is also a translation into Koine Greek known as the Septuagint, made in the last few centuries BCE. Extant ancient manuscripts of the Septuagint version include Codex Vaticanus (B; B; 4th century), Codex Sinaiticus (S; BHK: S; 4th century), Codex Alexandrinus (A; A; 5th century) and Codex Marchalianus (Q; Q; 6th century).

Parashot
The parashah sections listed here are based on the Aleppo Codex. Jeremiah 2 is a part of the Second prophecy (Jeremiah 2:1-3:5) in the Prophecies of Destruction (Jeremiah 1-25) section. {P}: open parashah; {S}: closed parashah.
 {P} 2:1-3 {P} 2:4-28 {S} 2:29-37 [3:1-5 {P}]

Analysis
This chapter belongs to a section comprising Jeremiah 2:1–25:38 about the 'Divine Judgment' on Judah and Jerusalem. The structure of the chapter is as follows.
 (i) The faithfulness of Israel’s youth: her ideal status (2:1-3)
 (ii) Israel’s apostasy (2:4-13) 
 (iii) The consequences of Israel‘s apostasy (2:14-19) 
 (iv) The fascination and futility of Baal worship (2:20-28) 
 (v) Israel deserves judgment (2:29-37)

The broken marriage between Yahweh and Israel (2:1–3)
Similar to the theme in Hosea 1–3, the relationship between Yahweh and the people of Israel is described using the marriage metaphor, where Yahweh acts as a husband to Judah as his wife. The poem in 2:1–3:5 shows the evidence of a broken covenant against Israel, addresses alternately between the two personae of Judah (or Jerusalem) as a female wife (using Hebrew feminine singular grammatical forms in 2:2; 2:17–25; 2:33–3:5) and the "male Israel" (using masculine singular and plural forms in 2:3; 2:4–16; 2:26–32). Yahweh accuses Israel of betraying and forsaking him, while he has been generous to bring them into a "plentiful land" (2:7), evoking sympathy for Yahweh who cannot understand this treachery.

Verse 1
Moreover the word of the  came to me, saying,

The unfaithfulness of Israel (2:4–37)

Verse 7
And I brought you into a plentiful country, to eat the fruit thereof and the goodness thereof; but when ye entered, ye defiled my land, and made mine heritage an abomination.

Verse 16
 Also the people of Noph and Tahpanhes
 Have broken the crown of your head.
Egypt, identified by its two cities, will inevitably hegemonize Israel.
 "Noph" is Memphis in ancient Egypt. 
"Tahpanhes": an important fortress city on the northern border of ancient Egypt in the northeastern Nile delta; generally equated with the Greek city of Daphne.
 "Broken": or "grazed".

Verse 18
And now why take the road to Egypt,
To drink the waters of Sihor?
Or why take the road to Assyria,
To drink the waters of the River?
The futility of relying on Egypt and Assyria was stated by other prophets (cf. ), but here it refers to the two political factions in Judah: the pro-Egyptians and the pro-Assyrians. This points to the early period of Jeremiah's ministry, when the two nations held the "balance of power in the Middle East"; this ends when Assyria collapsed in 612 BCE.
"Sihor" (lit. "blackness") refers to the Nile, whereas "the river" refers to the Euphrates (cf. ; ;).

Verse 36
Why do you gad about so much to change your way?
Also you shall be ashamed of Egypt as you were ashamed of Assyria.
Israel's two lovers will shame her.

See also

 Assyria
 Baal (Baalim)
 Chittim
 Egypt
 Euphrates
 Israel
 Jacob
 Jerusalem
 Kedar
 Noph
 Sihor
 Tahapanes

Related Bible parts: Isaiah 7, Isaiah 30, Isaiah 31, Jeremiah 1, Hosea 7, Hosea 9

References

Sources

External links

Jewish
Jeremiah 2 Original Hebrew with Parallel English

Christian
Jeremiah 2 English Translation with Parallel Latin Vulgate

02